Champhung is a Tangkhulic language known only from a wordlist provided by Brown
(1837).

References

Mortensen, David R. (2012). Database of Tangkhulic Languages. (unpublished ms. contributed to STEDT).
Mortensen, David. 2014. The Tangkhulic Tongues - How I Started Working on Endangered Languages.

Tangkhulic languages